John Louie Chaney (February 29, 1920 – August 9, 2004) was an American basketball player and coach. He played collegiately for Louisiana State University (LSU). Upon graduation, John suited up in the National Basketball League and National Basketball Association. Teams include the Syracuse Nationals, Tri-Cities Blackhawks and Sheboygan Red Skins.

Following his basketball playing career, Chaney became a men's basketball assistant coach at LSU. He played a significant role in the Tigers' 1953 first-ever NCAA Final Four appearance, SEC championship, and 1954 SEC co-championship.

References

External links
 

1920 births
2004 deaths
American men's basketball players
Basketball players from Louisiana
Centers (basketball)
Forwards (basketball)
LSU Tigers basketball coaches
LSU Tigers basketball players
Sheboygan Red Skins players
Syracuse Nationals players
Tri-Cities Blackhawks players